The team championship, para-equestrian dressage event at the 2012 Summer Paralympics was decided by tests ridden at Greenwich Park in London. Each rider performed two tests, the Team Test on 30–31 August and the Individual Championship Test on 1–2 September (for which individual medals were also awarded). Team scores were the sum of the best 3 individual aggregates.

Team ranking
TT = Team Test; CT = Championship Test; # = Score not counted in team total.
EL = Eliminated; WD = Withdrawn; RT = Retired.

Team Test – Grade Ia

The Grade Ia Team Test was ridden on 31 August.

Juror at E: Freddy Leyman; H: Anne Prain; C: Carlos Lopes; M: Kjell Myhre; B: Gudrun Hofinga.

T = Team Member (non-team riders also participated).

Team Test – Grade Ib

The Grade Ib Team Test was ridden on 30 August.

Juror at E: Gudrun Hofinga; H: Kjell Myhre; C: Lilian Iannone; M: Freddy Leyman; B: Carlos Lopes.

Team Test – Grade II

The Grade II Team Test was ridden on 30 August.

Juror at E: Sarah Rodger; H: Freddy Leyman; C: Kjell Myhre; M: Anne Prain; B: Gudrun Hofinga.

Team Test – Grade III

The Grade III Team Test was ridden on 31 August.

Juror at E: Anne Prain; H: Sarah Rodger; C: Freddy Leyman; M: Gudrun Hofinga; B: Lilian Iannone.

Team Test – Grade IV

The Grade IV Team Test was ridden on 31 August.

Juror at E: Lilian Iannone; H: Carlos Lopes; C: Anne Prain; M: Sarah Rodger; B: Kjell Myhre.

References

External links
 

Team